Bong Kalo (born 18 January 1997) is a Ni-Vanuatu footballer who plays as a midfielder.

Early career 
Kalo was born in the Port Vila suburb of Fresh Water 5. He started playing at Wan Smol Bag Futsal court. When he was 12 he joined Teouma Academy, the national football academy of Vanuatu.

Club career

Tafea 
Kalo joined Tafea in 2012. From the beginning he was an important member of the team winning several trophies with the club. He featured in the OFC Champions League twice, in 2014 and 2015. He played 6 matches in the Champions League in which he scored one goal, a penalty kick in a 3–1 loss to AS Magenta from New Caledonia.

Ascona 
After Kalo played well at the 2017 FIFA U-20 World Cup he was linked with several European pro-clubs. In August 2017 he went on trial with Spanish outfit CD Leganés. He impressed because Leganés decided to offer him a longer stay at the club but it was an offer without a contract. After Kalo had also been linked with clubs in Italy, Switzerland (FC Lugano), Germany (Borussia Dortmund) and New Zealand (Wellington Phoenix), he signed a contract with the amateur club FC Ascona in the Swiss 2. Liga Interregional.

Nalkutan
In January 2018 Kalo joined Vanuatuan club Nalkutan to play for them in the 2018 OFC Champions League. He scored 2 goals in 7 matches in the continental tournament.

Lautoka FC
On January 4, 2019, it was announced that Bong Kalo would join Lautoka F.C. to play the 2019 OFC Champions League.

ABM Galaxy F.C. 
After playing in Fiji he returned to Vanuatu to play for ABM Galaxy F.C. He scored 4 goals in 5 matches in 2019 Port Vila FA Cup, helping Galaxy to be 2019 PVFA Cup runner-up.

International career

U17 
In 2013 Kalo was called up to play in the 2013 OFC U-17 Championship on home soil. 1–1 draws against Papua New Guinea and Fiji, a 2–1 loss against New Zealand, and two 3–1 victories against the Cook Islands and New Caledonia were not enough to top the group and to qualify for the 2013 FIFA U-17 World Cup.

U20 
In 2014 Kalo was called up to join the Vanuatu national under-20 football team in the 2014 OFC U-20 Championship. In this tournament he scored two goals in five matches. One goal in a 4–0 victory over American Samoa and the other goal in a 2–2 draw against Fiji. He also played in the other three matches: a 1–0 win over New Caledonia, a 0–0 draw against local rivals the Solomon Islands and a 4–2 victory over Papua New Guinea. Vanuatu became second behind Fiji who went to the 2015 FIFA U-20 World Cup in New Zealand.

In 2016 Kalo was named captain of the U20's for the 2016 OFC U-20 Championship on home soil. Kalo scored one goal during this tournament, a stunning volley in a 3–1 win during the group stage against Papua New Guinea. He also played in the other group matches: 1–0 victories against Fiji and New Caledonia. Vanuatu advanced to the semi-final and thanks to a late goal scored by Frederick Massing, assisted by Kalo, they won 2–1 against the Solomon Islands. In the final they went down 5–0 against New Zealand but they qualified for the U-20 World Cup. In March 2015 FIFA had decided that the OFC would get two slots at every FIFA U-20 and U-17 World Cup. This meant that Vanuatu had qualified for the 2017 FIFA U-20 World Cup in South Korea.

It was the first time that Vanuatu had qualified for a FIFA world event.
In 2017 Bong Kalo and his team participated in the FIFA U-20 World Cup in South Korea, Kalo was named captain and scored his first goal against Mexico in their first ever World Cup tournament. A brilliant finish from a through ball by teammate Ronaldo Wilkins. They lost the match to Mexico by 3–2. Kalo went on to score two more goals, including a fantastic free-kick against Germany, however they lost that match 3–2 as well.

U23 
In 2015 Kalo was called up to play with the Vanuatu U23's in the Pacific Games. This was a very good tournament for Vanuatu. They defeated the Federated States of Micronesia with 46 goals to nil. The news of this monster victory went viral, and for one day Vanuatu was world news. Vanuatu eventually reached the final but they lost again against Fiji after a penalty shoot out. So Fiji qualified for the 2016 Summer Olympics.

Senior 
Kalo made his debut for the Vanuatu national football team on November 7, 2015, in a 1–1 draw against Fiji. In 2016 Kalo was part of Vanuatu's squad for the 2016 OFC Nations Cup. This tournament was a disappointment for Kalo and his teammates after they were eliminated in the Group Stage.

Kalo scored his first senior international goal in the final of the 2017 Pacific Mini Games. He scored the game-winner in the 67th minute as Vanuatu defeated the Solomon Islands 3–2.

International goals
Scores and results list Vanuatu's goal tally first.

Honours

Club 
Tafea
 VFF National Super League : 2013, 2014
 Port Vila Shield: 2013 2014
 PVFA Cup: 2014

References

External links 
 National Football Teams profile
 
 

1997 births
Living people
Vanuatuan footballers
Association football midfielders
Vanuatu international footballers
ABM Galaxy F.C. players
Nalkutan F.C. players
2016 OFC Nations Cup players
People from Tafea Province
Vanuatu youth international footballers
Vanuatu under-20 international footballers